The year 1948 in film involved some significant events.

Top-grossing films (U.S.)
The top ten 1948 released films by box office gross in North America are as follows:

Events
 May 3 – The Supreme Court of the United States decide in United States v. Paramount Pictures, Inc. holding that the practice of block booking and ownership of theater chains by film studios constituted anti-competitive and monopolistic trade practices.
 Laurence Olivier's Hamlet becomes the first British film to win the American Academy Award for Best Picture.

Awards

Top ten money making stars

Notable films released in 1948
United States unless stated

#

3 Godfathers, starring John Wayne

A
Abbott and Costello Meet Frankenstein, starring Bud Abbott and Lou Costello
Act of Violence, starring Van Heflin, Robert Ryan, Janet Leigh
Adventures of Don Juan, starring Errol Flynn
Albuquerque, starring Randolph Scott and Barbara Britton
The Amazing Mr. X, starring Turhan Bey and Lynn Bari
L'Amore, directed by Roberto Rossellini, starring Anna Magnani – (Italy)
Anna Karenina, starring Vivien Leigh and Ralph Richardson – (GB)
Another Part of the Forest, starring Fredric March
April Showers, starring Ann Sothern and Jack Carson
Arch of Triumph, starring Ingrid Bergman, Charles Boyer, Charles Laughton, Ruth Warrick

B
B.F.'s Daughter, starring Barbara Stanwyck
Berlin Express, starring Merle Oberon and Robert Ryan
The Berliner (Berlin Balade), starring Gert Fröbe – (Germany)
Bicycle Thieves, directed by Vittorio De Sica – (Italy)
The Big Clock, starring Ray Milland, Charles Laughton, Elsa Lanchester, Maureen O'Sullivan
Blanche Fury, starring Valerie Hobson and Stewart Granger – (GB)
Blonde Ice, starring Leslie Brooks
Blood on the Moon, starring Robert Mitchum
Bodyguard, starring Lawrence Tierney and Priscilla Lane
The Boy with Green Hair, directed by Joseph Losey, starring Dean Stockwell and Robert Ryan
The Bride Goes Wild, directed by Norman Taurog, starring June Allyson and Van Johnson

C
Call Northside 777, starring James Stewart
La calle sin sol (The Sunless Street) – (Spain)
Campus Honeymoon, starring Lee and Lyn Wilde
Canon City, starring Scott Brady
Command Decision, starring Clark Gable
Counterblast, directed by Paul L. Stein, starring Mervyn Johns – (GB)
Cry of the City, starring Victor Mature and Richard Conte

D
The Dark Past, starring William Holden, Lee J. Cobb, Nina Foch
A Date with Judy, starring Wallace Beery, Jane Powell, Elizabeth Taylor and Carmen Miranda
Dédée d'Anvers, starring Simone Signoret – (France)
Drunken Angel (Yoidore tenshi), directed by Akira Kurosawa, starring Takashi Shimura and Toshiro Mifune – (Japan)

E
The Eagle with Two Heads (L'Aigle à deux têtes), directed by Jean Cocteau – (France)
Easter Parade, starring Judy Garland, Fred Astaire and Peter Lawford
The Emperor Waltz, starring Bing Crosby
Escape, directed by Joseph L. Mankiewicz, starring Rex Harrison – (GB/U.S.)
Eva – (Sweden)
Every Girl Should Be Married, starring Cary Grant

F
The Fallen Idol, written by Graham Greene and directed by Carol Reed, starring Ralph Richardson – (GB)
Fighter Squadron, directed by Raoul Walsh, starring Edmond O'Brien and Robert Stack
Force of Evil, starring John Garfield
A Foreign Affair, directed by Billy Wilder, starring Jean Arthur and Marlene Dietrich
Fort Apache, directed by John Ford and starring John Wayne, Henry Fonda, Shirley Temple
Four Faces West, starring Joel McCrea and Frances Dee

G
Germany Year Zero (Germania anno zero), directed by Roberto Rossellini – (Italy)
God Reward You (Dios se lo pague), starring Arturo de Córdova – (Argentina)
Good Sam, directed by Leo McCarey, starring Gary Cooper
Good-Time Girl, starring Jean Kent and Dennis Price – (GB)
Green Grass of Wyoming, starring Peggy Cummins and Charles Coburn
The Green Promise, starring Marguerite Chapman and Walter Brennan
The Guinea Pig, a Boulting Brothers film starring Richard Attenborough – (GB)

H
Half Past Midnight, starring Kent Taylor and Peggy Knudsen
Hamlet, directed by and starring Laurence Olivier, with Basil Sydney and Jean Simmons – (GB)
He Walked by Night, starring Richard Basehart and Jack Webb
A Hen in the Wind (Kaze no naka no mendori), directed by Yasujirō Ozu – (Japan)
Hollow Triumph, starring Paul Henreid and Joan Bennett
Homecoming, starring Clark Gable, Lana Turner, Anne Baxter, John Hodiak

I
I Remember Mama, directed by George Stevens, starring Irene Dunne
I Walk Alone, starring Burt Lancaster and Kirk Douglas
The Iron Curtain, directed by William Wellman, starring Gene Tierney, Dana Andrews, June Havoc
Isn't It Romantic?, starring Veronica Lake

J
Joan of Arc, starring Ingrid Bergman
Johnny Belinda, starring Jane Wyman and Lew Ayres
Julia Misbehaves starring Greer Garson, Walter Pidgeon, Peter Lawford and Elizabeth Taylor
June Bride, starring Bette Davis

K
Key Largo, directed by John Huston, starring Humphrey Bogart, Edward G. Robinson, Lauren Bacall, Lionel Barrymore, Claire Trevor
Kiss the Blood off My Hands, starring Joan Fontaine and Burt Lancaster
The Kissing Bandit, starring Kathryn Grayson and Frank Sinatra
Krakatit, directed by Otakar Vávra (Czechoslovakia)

L
La Terra Trema, directed by Luchino Visconti (Italy)
Ladies of the Chorus, starring Marilyn Monroe
Lal Dupatta, starring Madhubala (India)
The Lame Devil (Le Diable boiteux), directed by and starring Sacha Guitry – (France)
Letter from an Unknown Woman, directed by Max Ophüls, starring Joan Fontaine and Louis Jourdan
London Belongs to Me, starring Richard Attenborough and Alastair Sim – (GB)
Louisiana Story, documentary by Robert J. Flaherty
The Loves of Carmen, starring Rita Hayworth
The Luck of the Irish, starring Tyrone Power and Anne Baxter
Luxury Liner, starring Jane Powell and George Brent

M
Macbeth, directed by and starring Orson Welles
The Mating of Millie, starring Evelyn Keyes and Glenn Ford
Mela, starring Dilip Kumar – (India)
Melody Time, starring Roy Rogers & Trigger and The Andrews Sisters
Mexican Hayride, starring Bud Abbott and Lou Costello
Michurin, directed by Alexander Dovzhenko – (U.S.S.R.)
Miranda, directed by Ken Annakin, starring Glynis Johns – (GB)
Miss Tatlock's Millions, starring Wanda Hendrix, Barry Fitzgerald, John Lund
The Monkey's Paw, starring Milton Rosmer – (GB)
Moonrise, directed by Frank Borzage, starring Gail Russell and Dane Clark
Morituri – (Germany)
Mr. Blandings Builds His Dream House, starring Cary Grant and Myrna Loy
My Dear Secretary, starring Kirk Douglas, Laraine Day
Myriad of Lights (Wanjia denghuo) – (China)
The Mysterious Apartment (Den hemmelighetsfulle leiligheten) – (Norway)

N
The Naked City, directed by Jules Dassin, starring Barry Fitzgerald
Night Has a Thousand Eyes, starring Edward G. Robinson
No Orchids for Miss Blandish – (GB)No Room at the Inn, starring Freda Jackson and Hermione Baddeley – (GB)Noose, starring Carole LandisThe Noose Hangs High, starring Bud Abbott and Lou CostelloNosotros los Pobres (We the Poor), starring Pedro Infante – (Mexico)

OOn an Island with You starring Esther Williams, Peter Lawford, Ricardo Montalbán, Cyd Charisse, and Jimmy DuranteOne Sunday Afternoon, starring Dennis MorganOne Touch of Venus, starring Robert Walker and Ava Gardner Oliver Twist, directed by David Lean, starring Alec Guinness and Robert Newton – (GB)On Our Own Land (Na svoji zemlji) – (Yugoslavia)

PThe Paleface, starring Bob Hope and Jane RussellLes Parents terribles, directed by Jean Cocteau, starring Jean Marais – (France)The Pirate, starring Gene Kelly and Judy GarlandPitfall, starring Dick Powell, Lizabeth Scott, Jane Wyatt, Raymond BurrPort of Call (Hamnstad), directed by Ingmar Bergman – (Sweden)Portrait of Jennie, starring Jennifer Jones

QQuartet, starring Mai Zetterling – (GB)

RRace Street, starring George Raft and William BendixRachel and the Stranger, starring Loretta Young, William Holden, Robert MitchumRaw Deal, directed by Anthony Mann, starring Dennis O'Keefe, Claire Trevor, Marsha Hunt, Raymond BurrRed River, directed by Howard Hawks, starring John Wayne, Montgomery Clift, Walter Brennan, Joanne Dru, John IrelandThe Red Shoes, directed by Michael Powell and Emeric Pressburger, starring Moira Shearer and Anton Walbrook – (GB)Relentless, starring Robert YoungThe Return of October, starring Glenn FordRoad House, starring Ida LupinoRogues' Regiment, directed by Robert Florey and starring Dick Powell, Märta Torén, Vincent PriceRomance on the High Seas, starring Jack Carson, Janis Paige, Doris Day (film debut)Rope, directed by Alfred Hitchcock, starring James StewartRuthless, starring Zachary Scott and Diana Lynn

SSaigon, the final of 4 films starring Alan Ladd and Veronica LakeThe Sainted Sisters, starring Veronica Lake and Joan CaulfieldSaraband for Dead Lovers, starring Stewart Granger and Joan Greenwood – (GB)Scott of the Antarctic, starring John Mills – (GB)Sealed Verdict, starring Ray MillandThe Search, directed by Fred Zinnemann, starring Montgomery Clift – (US/Switzerland)Secret Beyond the Door, directed by Fritz Lang, starring Joan Bennett and Michael RedgraveSenza pietà (Without Pity) – (Italy)Shaheed, starring Dilip Kumar – (India)Silver River, starring Errol Flynn and Ann SheridanSitting Pretty, starring Robert Young and Maureen O'HaraSleep, My Love, starring Claudette ColbertSleeping Car to Trieste, starring Jean Kent – (GB)Smart Girls Don't Talk, starring Virginia MayoThe Snake Pit, starring Olivia de HavillandSo Evil My Love, starring Ray Milland, Ann Todd, Geraldine Fitzgerald – (GB)A Song Is Born, starring Danny KayeSorry, Wrong Number, starring Barbara Stanwyck and Burt LancasterSpring in a Small Town (Xiǎochéng zhī chūn), directed by Fei Mu – (China)Spring in Park Lane, starring Anna Neagle and Michael Wilding – (GB)State of the Union, starring Spencer Tracy and Katharine HepburnStation West, starring Dick Powell and Jane GreerThe Street with No Name, starring Richard Widmark

TTap Roots, starring Van Heflin and Susan HaywardLa Terra Trema (The Earth Will Tremble), directed by Luchino Visconti – (Italy)They Live by Night, directed by Nicholas Ray, starring Farley Granger and Cathy O'DonnellThe Three Musketeers, starring Lana Turner and Gene KellyThe Time of Your Life, starring James CagneyTragic Hunt (Caccia tragica) – (Italy)The Treasure of the Sierra Madre, directed by John Huston (Oscars for best director and best screenplay), starring Humphrey Bogart and Walter Huston (best supporting actor)Treasured Earth (Talpalatnyi föld) – (Hungary)Los tres huastecos, starring Pedro Infante – (Mexico)

UUnder the Sun of Rome (Sotto il sole di Roma), directed by Renato Castellani – (Italy)Unfaithfully Yours, starring Linda Darnell and Rex HarrisonUp in Central Park, directed by William A. Seiter, starring Deanna Durbin and Vincent PriceUstedes los ricos (you the Rich), starring Pedro Infante – (Mexico)

VVidya, starring Dev Anand – (India)

WWaverley Steps: A Visit to Edinburgh – (GB) documentaryWestern Heritage, starring Tim HoltWhen My Baby Smiles at Me, starring Betty Grable and Dan DaileyWhen You Come HomeWhiplash, starring Alexis Smith and Dane ClarkWhispering Smith, starring Alan Ladd and Robert PrestonThe Winslow Boy, directed by Anthony Asquith, starring Robert Donat and Margaret Leighton – (GB)

YYellow Sky, starring Gregory Peck, Anne Baxter, Richard WidmarkYou Gotta Stay Happy, starring Joan Fontaine and James StewartThe Young Guard (Molodaya Gvardiya) – (U.S.S.R.)

SerialsG-Men Never Forget, starring Clayton MooreDangers of the Canadian MountedAdventures of Frank and Jesse James, starring Clayton MooreSuperman, starring Kirk Alyn and Noel NeillTex GrangerCongo BillShort film seriesMickey Mouse (1928–1952)Terrytoons (1930–1964)Popeye (1933–1957)The Three Stooges (1934–1959)Donald Duck (1936–1956)Goofy (1939–1953)Tom and Jerry (1940–1958)Bugs Bunny (1940–1964)The Fox and the Crow (1941–1950)Woody Woodpecker (1941–1949)Mighty Mouse (1942–1955)Chip and Dale (1943–1956)Droopy (1943–1958)Yosemite Sam (1945–1964)George and Junior (1946—1948)Blackie the Sheep (1947–1949)

Births
January 10 – William Sanderson, American actor
January 12 - Anthony Andrews, English actor
January 13 - Malcolm Storry, British actor
January 14 – Carl Weathers, American actor and football player
January 16 – John Carpenter, American director, producer and screenwriter
January 18 - M. C. Gainey, American character actor
January 29 – Marc Singer, Canadian actor
February 5
Christopher Guest, American-British screenwriter, musician, director, actor and comedian
Barbara Hershey, American actress
Tom Wilkinson, English actor
February 9 - David Hayman, Scottish actor and director
February 15 – Tino Insana, American actor, producer, writer, voice artist and comedian (d. 2017)
February 16 - Troy Evans (actor), American actor
February 17 - Anne Lonnberg, American actress and singer of Swedish descent
February 18 - Sinéad Cusack, Irish actress
February 20 – Jennifer O'Neill, American actress
February 22 – John Ashton, American actor
February 23 - Dennis Waterman, English actor and singer (d. 2022)
February 25 - K.P.A.C Lalitha, Indian actress (d. 2022)
February 28
Mike Figgis, English director and screenwriter
Bernadette Peters, American actress and singer
Mercedes Ruehl, American actress
February 29 - Ken Foree, American actor
March 1 - Karl Johnson, Welsh actor
March 4 - Brian Cummings, American voice actor
March 5 - Annette Charles, American actress and dancer (d. 2011)
March 6 - Anna Maria Horsford, American actress
March 14 – Billy Crystal, American actor and comedian
March 20 – Helene Vannari, Estonian actress (d. 2022)
March 25 – Bonnie Bedelia, American actress
March 26 - Steven Tyler, American singer, songwriter, musician and actor
March 28
Matthew Corbett, English television personality, actor, writer, puppeteer and comedian
March 29 – Bud Cort, American actor
March 31 - Rhea Perlman, American actress and writer
April 5 - Carlos Carrasco (actor), American actor
April 6 - Patrika Darbo, American actress
April 9 – Jaya Bachchan, Indian actress
April 20 - Gregory Itzin, American character actor (d. 2022)
April 25 – Freda Foh Shen, American film, television and theatre actress
May 3 – Chris Mulkey, American actor
May 11 - Pam Ferris, Welsh actress
May 12
Lindsay Crouse, American actress
Richard Riehle, American actor
May 15 - Malcolm Stewart (actor), Canadian actor
May 18 - Jesper Christensen, Danish actor
May 21 – Jonathan Hyde, Australian-born English actor
May 24 - James Cosmo, Scottish actor
June 1 - Powers Boothe, American actor (d. 2017)
June 7 - Xavier Saint-Macary, French actor (d. 1988)
June 11 - Michael Swan, American actor
June 21 - Ian McEwan, English author
June 22 - Steve Eastin, American character actor
June 28
Kathy Bates, American actress
J. Michael Riva, American production designer (d. 2011)
July 2 - Saul Rubinek, German-born Canadian actor, director and producer
July 5 - William Hootkins, American actor (d. 2005)
July 12
Susan Blu, American voice actress, voice director and casting director
Ben Burtt, American sound designer
July 13 – Catherine Breillat, French director
July 20 - Muse Watson, American actor
July 26 - Leon Vitali, English actor (d. 2022)
July 28 - Georgia Engel, American actress (d. 2019)
July 30 – Jean Reno, French actor
August 5 - Barbara Flynn, English actress
August 13 - Peter Iacangelo, American actor (d. 2021)
August 14
Joseph Marcell, British actor and comedian
Lou Wagner, American actor
August 19 - Jim Carter (actor), English actor
August 20 - John Noble, Australian actor
August 30 – Lewis Black, American actor and comedian
September 1 - James Rebhorn, American character actor (d. 2014)
September 7 – Susan Blakely, American actress
September 11 - Philip Alford, former American actor
September 15 - Kathryn Kates, American actress (d. 2022)
September 17 - John Ritter, American actor (d. 2003)
September 19 – Jeremy Irons, English actor
September 24
Gordon Clapp, American actor
Phil Hartman, Canadian-American actor (d. 1998)
September 26 - Olivia Newton-John, British-born Australian actress and singer (d. 2022)
October 2 – Persis Khambatta, Indian actress and model (d. 1998)
October 5 - Sal Viscuso, American actor
October 8 - James Harper (actor), American actor
October 11 - John R. Cherry III, American director and screenwriter (d. 2022)
October 14 - Gerard Murphy (actor), Irish actor (d. 2013)
October 16 – Hema Malini, Indian actress and politician
October 17
Margot Kidder, Canadian actress (d. 2018)
George Wendt, American actor and comedian
October 21 - Tom Everett, American actor
October 28 - Telma Hopkins, American actress and singer
October 29 – Kate Jackson, American actress
October 30 - Don Creech, American actor
October 31 - Michael Kitchen, English actor and producer
November 11 – Vincent Schiavelli, American actor (d. 2005)
November 13 – Adelle Lutz, American model, actress, and costume designer
November 14 – Robert Ginty, American actor and producer (d. 2009)
November 18 – Dom Irrera, American actor and stand-up comedian
November 20 - Richard Masur, American character actor
November 26 - Marianne Muellerleile, American actress
November 28 – Agnieszka Holland, Polish director and screenwriter
November 30 - Larry Bishop, American actor, screenwriter and director
December 6 – JoBeth Williams, American actress and director
December 14
Dee Wallace, American actress
December 15
Melanie Chartoff, American actress and comedian
Cassandra Harris, Australian actress (d. 1991)
December 21 – Samuel L. Jackson, American actor and producer
December 27 – Gérard Depardieu, French actor and filmmaker

Deaths
January 7 – Charles C. Wilson, 53, American actor, It Happened One Night, The Hell Cat, Waterfront Lady, Legion of TerrorFebruary 11 – Sergei Eisenstein, 50, Russian film director, Battleship Potemkin, Alexander Nevsky, Ivan the Terrible, Part One, Ivan the Terrible, Part TwoFebruary 14 – James Baskett, 44, American actor, Song of the SouthFebruary 23 – Patricia Farr, 35, American actress, Lady Luck, Criminals of the Air, Girls Can Play, Lady Behave!March 25 – Warren Hymer, 42, American actor, Up the River, She's Dangerous, The Lady and the MobMay 3 – Gideon Wahlberg, 58, Swedish actor, writer and film director
May 12 – Dante Cappelli, 82, Italian actor, Macbeth, Love Everlasting, The Mysterious MirrorMay 26 – Torsten Bergström, 51, Swedish actor and director, The Pilgrimage to Kevlaar, Trollebokungen, UngdomMay 29 – May Whitty, 82, English actress, Lassie Come Home, Gaslight, My Name Is Julia RossJuly 5 – Carole Landis, 29, American actress, Topper Returns, I Wake Up Screaming, One Million B.C., Four Jills in a JeepJuly 15 – William Selig, 84, American pioneer studio builder
July 23 – David Wark Griffith, 73, American film director, The Birth of a Nation, Intolerance, Broken Blossoms, Orphans of the StormAugust 13 – Elaine Hammerstein, 51, American actress, Paint and Powder, The Midnight ExpressAugust 13 – Edwin Maxwell, 62, American actor, Duck Soup, Cleopatra, His Girl FridaySeptember 24 – Warren William, 53, American actor, Gold Diggers of 1933, The Wolf Man, Lady for a Day, Imitation of LifeSeptember 28 – Gregg Toland, 44, American cinematographer, Citizen Kane, The Best Years of Our Lives, The Long Voyage Home, December 7th: The Movie, Wuthering Heights, The Grapes of Wrath, Song of the South, The Little FoxesOctober 10 – Mary Eaton, 47, American actress, Glorifying the American Girl, The CocoanutsOctober 13 – Samuel S. Hinds, 73, American actor, It's a Wonderful Life, Buck PrivatesOctober 16 – Nora Lane, 43, American actress, The Cisco Kid, Six-Gun TrailOctober 21 – Elissa Landi, 43, Austrian-American actress, The Count of Monte Cristo, After the Thin ManNovember 9 - Edgar Kennedy, 58, American actor, Duck Soup, A Star Is BornDecember 20 – C. Aubrey Smith, 85, English actor, A Bill of Divorcement, Madame Curie Film debuts 
Claire Bloom – The Blind GoddessBeau Bridges – No Minor VicesPat Buttram – The Strawberry RoanDoris Day – Romance on the High SeasJosé Ferrer – Joan of ArcKathleen Freeman – The Naked CityAldo Giuffrè – Assunta SpinaMichael Gough – Blanche FuryJames Gregory – The Naked CityLaurence Harvey – House of DarknessAudrey Hepburn – Dutch in Seven LessonsRock Hudson – Fighter SquadronHoward Keel – The Small VoiceKlaus Kinski – MorituriEartha Kitt – CasbahChristopher Lee – Corridor of MirrorsMargaret Leighton – Bonnie Prince CharlieAudie Murphy – Texas, Brooklyn & HeavenBarbara Murray – Anna Karenina 
Debra Paget – Cry of the CityIrene Papas – Fallen AngelsNehemiah Persoff – The Naked CityJohn Randolph – The Naked CityDebbie Reynolds – June Bride''

References

 
Film by year